John Leverett (August 25, 1662 – May 3, 1724) was an early Anglo-American lawyer, politician, educator, and President of Harvard College.

Early life

John Leverett was the son of Hudson Leverett, an attorney, and Sarah (Payton) Leverett, (and grandson of John Leverett the Governor of the Massachusetts Bay Colony).  He was educated at Boston Latin School and Harvard College (A.B., 1680; A.M., 1683).

Career

For twelve years Leverett was a resident fellow at Harvard. He was appointed in 1685 at the same time as William Brattle.  Leverett and Brattle managed Harvard College while Harvard's President Increase Mather was in England for four years (1688–1692)

Leverett married on November 25, 1697, the daughter of former Harvard College president John Rogers, Margaret Rogers Berry. They had nine children, six died in infancy. Margaret died on June 7, 1720.  Leverett married secondly Sarah Crisp Harris. Sarah died on April 4, 1744.

John served in the Province of Massachusetts Bay as a justice of the peace (1699), a judge in the Court of Admiralty (1705), a justice of the Superior Court (1702–1708), judge of Probate Court for Middlesex County in Cambridge (1702–1708), legislator(1696–1702) and Speaker of the Colonial Massachusetts House of Representatives (1700–1702), and provincial councillor for eastern Maine (1706–1708).

Leverett acted as an Indian commissioner from Massachusetts during Queen Anne's War (1701–1713). He was unable to persuade the Iroquois to enter the war on the side of the British at a conference in 1704.  Leverett raised and commanded a company of volunteers (as a lieutenant in the Military Company of Massachusetts, which he joined in 1704) in the failed assaults on French Port Royal, Acadia in 1707.

John served for sixteen years as President of Harvard from January 14, 1708, until his death in 1724. In 1709, Leverett served as an emissary from Massachusetts Governor Joseph Dudley to New York's Governor John Lovelace in negotiations for the establishment of military cooperation between Massachusetts and New York on the frontier and for an aborted invasion of Canada.

In 1719 Leverett helped to form the Lincolnshire Company which attempted to develop land in the Muscongus Patent in Maine, then part of Massachusetts. Leverett had inherited a share of this patent from his grandfather John Leverett. Nothing was accomplished and the grant was later taken over by Samuel Waldo, a Boston merchant.

He was elected a Fellow of the Royal Society in 1714.

On his death he was buried in the Old Burying Ground, Cambridge, Massachusetts.

References

External links
 Harvard University biographies of presidents, including John Leverett
 Inventory of John Leverett's Papers at Harvard University
 

1662 births
1724 deaths
Boston Latin School alumni
Harvard College alumni
Presidents of Harvard University
People of colonial Massachusetts
Justices of the Massachusetts Superior Court of Judicature
Fellows of the Royal Society